Dan Pletch (born 12 April 1983) is a Canadian rugby union player, who plays for the Canada national rugby team. He plays as a hooker or prop. Pletch, along with his identical twin brother Mike, was in the Canada squad for the 2007 World Cup.

References
scrum.com stats
rugbycanada profile

1983 births
Rugby union hookers
Canadian rugby union players
Sportspeople from Ontario
Living people
Canada international rugby union players
Twin sportspeople
Canadian twins